Buddha's Family 2: Desde La Prisión is the compilation album by various artists, released on December 20, 2005.

Track listing
CD 1 – Reggaeton
 Tempo and Don Omar – "Intro"
 Zion & Lennox – "Me Dirijo a Ella"
 Getto – "Hoy Yo Voy Por Ti"
 Gastam – "Castigo"
 Kenny & Eric – "Pérdida Total"
 MC Ceja – "Pelotera"
 Divino – "Me Trancaron"
 Don Omar and Tempo – "Yo Vivo En Guerra"
 Gastam & Chris – "Volviéndote Loca"
 R.K.M & Ken-Y – "Hoy Te Vi"
 Trebol Clan – "El Cantazo"
 Reta & Jan-K – "A Galope"
 Wibal & Alex – "Brusca"
 Edwal – "A Lo Gangster"
 Getto & Moreno – "Ven Mami"
 J-King & Maximan – "Party de Gangster"
 Virtual & Shorty – "Muñeca"
 JQ – "Dinamita"
 Molusko – "Otro/Sóplamela"

CD 2 – Hip hop
 Ivy Queen, Gallego, MC Ceja, Getto & Gastam, Cosculluela – "Intro" 
 Getto & Gastam – "No Problemas"
 MC Ceja – "Conflicto"
 Ivy Queen – "Ando Con Mi Corillo"
 Don Omar and Tempo – "Vivo En Guerra"
 MC Ceja and Gastam – "Rap vs. Federales"
 Héctor el Father and Naldo – "Si Quieren Guerra"
 Cosculluela and Getto – "Te Va a Ir Mal"
 Baby Rasta – "Como Yo Ninguno"
 Zeta – "No Me Sorprende"
 Getto & Gastam – "Hoy Voy Por Ti"
 Kenny – "We Don't Stop"
 Tommy Viera – "Los Cangri y Buddha's Family"
 Varon – "Dando de Que Hablar"
 Cuban Link and MC Ceja – "No Respect"
 Arcángel & De La Ghetto – "Policias Envidiosos"
 Ro-K – "Malcriao"
 Tempo and Getto) – "Narco Hampón (Remix)"

Chart performance

References

2005 compilation albums
Reggaeton compilation albums